The Archdeacon of Derry is a senior ecclesiastical officer within the Diocese of Derry and Raphoe.

The archdeaconry can trace its history from Giolla Domhnaill O'Foramain, the first known incumbent, who held the office in 1179 to the current incumbent Robert Miller. McBride  is responsible for the disciplinary supervision of the clergy and the upkeep of diocesan property within his half of the diocese.

References

Archdeacons of Derry
Lists of Anglican archdeacons in Ireland
 
Religion in Northern Ireland